Eucosmophora aspila is a moth of the family Gracillariidae. It is known from Brazil and Peru.

The length of the forewings is 3.3 mm for males and 3.5 for females.

Etymology

References

Acrocercopinae
Moths described in 2005